The 1946 Cork Senior Hurling Championship was the 58th staging of the Cork Senior Hurling Championship since its establishment by the Cork County Board in 1887. The championship began on 7 April 1946 and ended on 16 November 1946.

Glen Rovers were the defending champions.

On 16 November 1946, St. Finbarr's won the championship following a 2-3 to 2-1 defeat of Glen Rovers in the final. This was their 13th championship title overall and their first title in three championship seasons.

Results

First round

Glen Rovers received a bye in this round.

Second round

Semi-finals

Final

Championship statistics

Miscellaneous

The tricolour was flown at half mast and a two-minute silence was held at all games on 12 May in honour of IRA hunger striker Seán McCaughey who died in Portlaoise Prison the previous day.

References

Cork Senior Hurling Championship
Cork Senior Hurling Championship